Urbanowo may refer to the following places:
Urbanowo, part of the Jeżyce district of Poznań 
Urbanowo, Greater Poland Voivodeship (west-central Poland)
Urbanowo, Pomeranian Voivodeship (north Poland)
Urbanowo, Warmian-Masurian Voivodeship (north Poland)